Encyclopédie, ou dictionnaire raisonné des sciences, des arts et des métiers (English: Encyclopedia, or a Systematic Dictionary of the Sciences, Arts, and Crafts), better known as Encyclopédie, was a general encyclopedia published in France between 1751 and 1772, with later supplements, revised editions, and translations. It had many writers, known as the Encyclopédistes. It was edited by Denis Diderot and, until 1759, co-edited by Jean le Rond d'Alembert.

The Encyclopédie is most famous for representing the thought of the Enlightenment. According to Denis Diderot in the article "Encyclopédie", the Encyclopédie'''s aim was "to change the way people think" and for people (bourgeoisie) to be able to inform themselves and to know things. He and the other contributors advocated for the secularization of learning away from the Jesuits. Diderot wanted to incorporate all of the world's knowledge into the Encyclopédie and hoped that the text could disseminate all this information to the public and future generations. Thus, it is an example of democratization of knowledge.

It was also the first encyclopedia to include contributions from many named contributors, and it was the first general encyclopedia to describe the mechanical arts. In the first publication, seventeen folio volumes were accompanied by detailed engravings. Later volumes were published without the engravings, in order to better reach a wide audience within Europe.Robert Audi, Diderot, Denis" entry in The Cambridge Dictionary of Philosophy, (Cambridge University Press, 2015)

Origins

The Encyclopédie was originally conceived as a French translation of Ephraim Chambers's Cyclopaedia (1728). Ephraim Chambers had first published his Cyclopaedia, or an Universal Dictionary of Arts and Sciences in two volumes in London in 1728, following several dictionaries of arts and sciences that had emerged in Europe since the late 17th century.Robert Shackleton "The Encyclopedie" in: Proceedings, American Philosophical Society (vol. 114, No. 5, 1970. p. 39) This work became quite renowned, and four editions were published between 1738 and 1742. An Italian translation appeared between 1747 and 1754. In France a member of the banking family Lambert had started translating Chambers into French, but in 1745 the expatriate Englishman John Mills and German Gottfried Sellius were the first to actually prepare a French edition of Ephraim Chambers's Cyclopaedia for publication, which they entitled Encyclopédie.

Early in 1745 a prospectus for the Encyclopédie was published to attract subscribers to the project. This four page prospectus was illustrated by Jean-Michel Papillon, and accompanied by a plan, stating that the work would be published in five volumes from June 1746 until the end of 1748. The text was translated by Mills and Sellius, and it was corrected by an unnamed person, who appears to have been Denis Diderot.

The prospectus was reviewed quite positively and cited at some length in several journals. The Mémoires pour l'histoire des sciences et des beaux arts journal was lavish in its praise: "here are two of the greatest efforts undertaken in literature in a very long time" (voici deux des plus fortes entreprises de Littérature qu'on ait faites depuis long-temps). The Mercure Journal in June 1745, printed a 25-page article that specifically praised Mills' role as translator; the Journal introduced Mills as an English scholar who had been raised in France and who spoke both French and English as a native. The Journal reported that Mills had discussed the work with several academics, was zealous about the project, had devoted his fortune to support this enterprise, and was the sole owner of the publishing privilege.

However, the cooperation fell apart later on in 1745. André le Breton, the publisher commissioned to manage the physical production and sales of the volumes, cheated Mills out of the subscription money, claiming for example that Mills's knowledge of French was inadequate. In a confrontation Le Breton physically assaulted Mills. Mills took Le Breton to court, but the court decided in Le Breton's favour. Mills returned to England soon after the court's ruling.Comments by Le Breton are published in his biography; in the preface of the encyclopedia; in John Lough (1971); etc. For his new editor, Le Breton settled on the mathematician Jean Paul de Gua de Malves. Among those hired by Malves were the young Étienne Bonnot de Condillac, Jean le Rond d'Alembert, and Denis Diderot. Within thirteen months, in August 1747, Gua de Malves was fired for being an ineffective leader. Le Breton then hired Diderot and d'Alembert to be the new editors. Diderot would remain as editor for the next 25 years, seeing the Encyclopédie through to its completion; d'Alembert would leave this role in 1758. As d'Alembert worked on the Encyclopédie, its title expanded. As of 1750, the full title was Encyclopédie, ou Dictionnaire raisonné des sciences, des arts et des métiers, par une société de gens de lettres, mis en ordre par M. Diderot de l'Académie des Sciences et Belles-Lettres de Prusse, et quant à la partie mathématique, par M. d'Alembert de l'Académie royale des Sciences de Paris, de celle de Prusse et de la Société royale de Londres. ("Encyclopedia: or a Systematic Dictionary of the Sciences, Arts, and Crafts, by a Company of Persons of Letters, edited by M. Diderot of the Academy of Sciences and Belles-lettres of Prussia: as to the Mathematical Portion, arranged by M. d'Alembert of the Royal Academy of Sciences of Paris, of the Academy of Sciences in Prussia and of the Royal Society of London.") The title page was amended as d'Alembert acquired more titles.

Publication

The work consisted of 28 volumes, with 71,818 articles and 3,129 illustrations. The first seventeen volumes were published between 1751 and 1765; eleven volumes of plates were finished by 1772. Engraver Robert Bénard provided at least 1,800 plates for the work. The Encyclopédie sold 4,000 copies during its first twenty years of publication and earned a profit of 2 million livres for its investors. Because of its occasional radical contents, the Encyclopédie caused much controversy in conservative circles, and after the publication of the second volume, it was briefly suspended from publishing by royal edict of 1752. Joly de Fleury accused it of "destroying royal authority, fomenting a spirit of Independence and revolt, and...laying the foundations of an edifice of error, for the corruption of morals and religion, and the promotion of unbelief."Lyons, M. (2011). Books: A Living History (p. 34). Los Angeles: J. Paul Getty Museum.

Following the publication of the seventh volume, on the initiative of the Parlement of Paris, the French government suspended the encyclopedia's privilège in 1759.  Despite these issues, work continued "in secret," partially because the project had highly placed supporters, such as Malesherbes and Madame de Pompadour. The authorities deliberately ignored the continued work; they thought their official ban was sufficient to appease the church and other enemies of the project.

During the "secretive" period, Diderot accomplished a well-known work of subterfuge. The title pages of volumes 1 through 7, published between 1751 and 1757, claimed Paris as the place of publication. However, the title pages of the subsequent text volumes, 8 through 17, published together in 1765, show Neufchastel as the place of publication. Neuchâtel is safely across the French border in what is now part of Switzerland but which was then an independent principality, where official production of the Encyclopédie was secure from interference by agents of the French state. In particular, regime opponents of the Encyclopédie could not seize the production plates for the Encyclopédie in Paris because those printing plates ostensibly existed only in Switzerland. Meanwhile, the actual production of volumes 8 through 17 quietly continued in Paris.

In 1775, Charles Joseph Panckoucke obtained the rights to reissue the work. He issued five volumes of supplementary material and a two-volume index from 1776 to 1780. Some scholars include these seven "extra" volumes as part of the first full issue of the Encyclopédie, for a total of 35 volumes, although they were not written or edited by the original authors.

From 1782 to 1832, Panckoucke and his successors published an expanded edition of the work in some 166 volumes as the Encyclopédie Méthodique. That work, enormous for its time, occupied a thousand workers in production and 2,250 contributors.

Contributors
Since the objective of the editors of the Encyclopédie was to gather all the knowledge in the world, Diderot and D'Alembert knew they would need various contributors to help them with their project. Many of the philosophes (intellectuals of the French Enlightenment) contributed to the Encyclopédie, including Diderot himself, Voltaire, Rousseau, and Montesquieu. The most prolific contributor was Louis de Jaucourt, who wrote 17,266 articles between 1759 and 1765, or about eight per day, representing a full 25% of the Encyclopédie. The publication became a place where these contributors could share their ideas and interests.

Still, as Frank Kafker has argued, the Encyclopedists were not a unified group:

Following is a list of notable contributors with their area of contribution (for a more detailed list, see Encyclopédistes):

Jean Le Rond d'Alembert – editor; science (especially mathematics), contemporary affairs, philosophy, religion, among others
Claude Bourgelat – manège, farriery
André le Breton – chief publisher; article on printer's ink
Louis-Jean-Marie Daubenton – natural history
Denis Diderot – chief editor; economics, mechanical arts, philosophy, politics, religion, among others
Baron d'Holbach – science (chemistry, mineralogy), politics, religion, among others
Chevalier Louis de Jaucourt – economics, literature, medicine, politics, bookbinding, among others
Jean-Baptiste de La Chapelle – mathematics
Abbé André Morellet – theology, philosophy
Montesquieu – part of the article "Goût" ("Taste")
François Quesnay – articles on tax farmers and grain
Jean-Jacques Rousseau – music, political theory
Anne Robert Jacques Turgot, Baron de Laune – economics, etymology, philosophy, physics
Voltaire – history, literature, philosophy

Due to the controversial nature of some of the articles, several of its editors were sent to jail.

 Contents and controversies 

Structure
 Like most encyclopedias, the Encyclopédie attempted to collect and summarize human knowledge in a variety of fields and topics, ranging from philosophy to theology to science and the arts. The Encyclopédie was controversial for reorganizing knowledge based on human reason instead of by nature or theology. Knowledge and intellect branched from the three categories of human thought, whereas all other perceived aspects of knowledge, including theology, were simply branches or components of these human-made categories. The introduction to the Encyclopédie, D'Alembert's "Preliminary Discourse", is considered an important exposition of Enlightenment ideals. Among other things, it presents a taxonomy of human knowledge (see Fig. 3), which was inspired by Francis Bacon's The Advancement of Learning. The three main branches of knowledge are: "Memory"/History, "Reason"/Philosophy, and "Imagination"/Poetry. This tree of knowledge was created to help readers evaluate the usefulness of the content within the Encyclopédie, and to organize its content. Notable is the fact that theology is ordered under "Philosophy" and that "Knowledge of God" is only a few nodes away from "Divination" and "Black Magic".

Religious and political controversies
The authors of the Encyclopédie challenged religious authority. The authors, especially Diderot and d'Alembert, located religion within a system of reason and philosophy. They did not reject all religious claims, but believed theology and notions of God must be proven. Louis de Jaucourt therefore harshly criticized superstition as an intellectual error in his article on the topic. They therefore doubted the authenticity of presupposed historical events cited in the Bible and questioned the validity of miracles and the Resurrection. However, some contemporary scholars argue the skeptical view of miracles in the Encyclopédie may be interpreted in terms of "Protestant debates about the cessation of the charismata."

These challenges led to suppression from church and state authorities. The Encyclopédie and its contributors endured many attacks and attempts at censorship by the clergy or other censors, which threatened the publication of the project as well as the authors themselves. The King's Council suppressed the Encyclopédie in 1759. The Catholic Church, under Pope Clement XIII, placed it on its list of banned books. Prominent intellectuals criticized it, most famously Lefranc de Pompignan at the French Academy. A playwright, Charles Palissot de Montenoy, wrote a play called Les Philosophes to criticize the Encyclopédie. When Abbé André Morellet, one of the contributors to the Encyclopédie, wrote a mock preface for it, he was sent to the Bastille due to allegations of libel.

To defend themselves from controversy, the encyclopedia’s articles wrote of theological topics in a mixed manner. Some articles supported orthodoxy, and some included overt criticisms of Christianity. To avoid direct retribution from censors, writers often hid criticism in obscure articles or expressed it in ironic terms. Nonetheless, the contributors still openly attacked the Catholic Church in certain articles with examples including criticizing excess festivals, monasteries, and celibacy of the clergy.

Politics and society
The Encyclopédie is often seen as an influence for the French Revolution because of its emphasis on Enlightenment political theories. Diderot and other authors, in famous articles such as "Political Authority", emphasized the shift of the origin of political authority from divinity or heritage to the people. This Enlightenment ideal, espoused by Rousseau and others, advocated that people have the right to consent to their government in a form of social contract.

Another major, contentious component of political issues in the Encyclopédie was personal or natural rights. Articles such as "Natural Rights" by Diderot explained the relationship between individuals and the general will. The natural state of humanity, according to the authors, is barbaric and unorganized. To balance the desires of individuals and the needs of the general will, humanity requires civil society and laws that benefit all persons. Writers, to varying degrees, criticized Thomas Hobbes' notions of a selfish humanity that requires a sovereign to rule over it.

In terms of economics, the Encyclopédie expressed favor for laissez-faire ideals or principles of economic liberalism. Articles concerning economics or markets, such as "Economic Politics", generally favored free competition and denounced monopolies. Articles often criticized guilds as creating monopolies and approved of state intervention to remove such monopolies. The writers advocated extending laissez-faire principles of liberalism from the market to the individual level, such as with privatization of education and opening of careers to all levels of wealth.

Science and technology
At the same time, the Encyclopédie was a vast compendium of knowledge, notably on the technologies of the period, describing the traditional craft tools and processes. Much information was taken from the Descriptions des Arts et Métiers. These articles applied a scientific approach to understanding the mechanical and production processes, and offered new ways to improve machines to make them more efficient. Diderot felt that people should have access to "useful knowledge" that they can apply to their everyday life.

Influence
The Encyclopédie played an important role in the intellectual foment leading to the French Revolution. "No encyclopaedia perhaps has been of such political importance, or has occupied so conspicuous a place in the civil and literary history of its century. It sought not only to give information, but to guide opinion," wrote the 1911 Encyclopædia Britannica. In The Encyclopédie and the Age of Revolution, a work published in conjunction with a 1989 exhibition of the Encyclopédie at the University of California, Los Angeles, Clorinda Donato writes the following:

While many contributors to the Encyclopédie had no interest in radically reforming French society, the Encyclopédie as a whole pointed that way. The Encyclopédie denied that the teachings of the Catholic Church could be treated as authoritative in matters of science. The editors also refused to treat the decisions of political powers as definitive in intellectual or artistic questions. Some articles talked about changing social and political institutions that would improve their society for everyone. Given that Paris was the intellectual capital of Europe at the time and that many European leaders used French as their administrative language, these ideas had the capacity to spread.

The Encyclopédies influence continues today. Historian Dan O'Sullivan compares it to Wikipedia:

Statistics
Approximate size of the Encyclopédie:

 17 volumes of articles, issued from 1751 to 1765
 11 volumes of illustrations, issued from 1762 to 1772
 18,000 pages of text
 75,000 entries
44,000 main articles
28,000 secondary articles
2,500 illustration indices
 20,000,000 words in total

Print run: 4,250 copies (note: even single-volume works in the 18th century seldom had a print run of more than 1,500 copies).

Quotations

 "The goal of an encyclopedia is to assemble all the knowledge scattered on the surface of the earth, to demonstrate the general system to the people with whom we live, & to transmit it to the people who will come after us, so that the works of centuries past is not useless to the centuries which follow, that our descendants, by becoming more learned, may become more virtuous & happier, & that we do not die without having merited being part of the human race." (Encyclopédie, Diderot)"En effet, le but d'une Encyclopédie est de rassembler les connoissances éparses sur la surface de la terre; d'en exposer le système général aux hommes avec qui nous vivons, & de le transmettre aux hommes qui viendront après nous; afin que les travaux des siecles passés n'aient pas été des travaux inutiles pour les siecles qui succéderont; que nos neveux, devenant plus instruits, deviennent en même tems plus vertueux & plus heureux, & que nous ne mourions pas sans avoir bien mérité du genre humain." From uchicago.edu.
 "Reason is to the philosopher what grace is to the Christian...  Other men walk in darkness; the philosopher, who has the same passions, acts only after reflection;  he walks through the night, but it is preceded by a torch.  The philosopher forms his principles on an infinity of particular observations.  He does not confuse truth with plausibility; he takes for truth what is true, for forgery what is false, for doubtful what is doubtful, and probable what is probable.  The philosophical spirit is thus a spirit of observation and accuracy." (Philosophers, Dumarsais)
 "If exclusive privileges were not granted, and if the financial system would not tend to concentrate wealth, there would be few great fortunes and no quick wealth.  When the means of growing rich is divided between a greater number of citizens, wealth will also be more evenly distributed; extreme poverty and extreme wealth would be also rare." (Wealth, Diderot)
 "Aguaxima, a plant growing in Brazil and on the islands of South America. This is all that we are told about it; and I would like to know for whom such descriptions are made. It cannot be for the natives of the countries concerned, who are likely to know more about the aguaxima than is contained in this description, and who do not need to learn that the aguaxima grows in their country. It is as if you said to a Frenchman that the pear tree is a tree that grows in France, in Germany, etc. It is not meant for us either, for what do we care that there is a tree in Brazil named aguaxima, if all we know about it is its name? What is the point of giving the name? It leaves the ignorant just as they were and teaches the rest of us nothing. If all the same I mention this plant here, along with several others that are described just as poorly, then it is out of consideration for certain readers who prefer to find nothing in a dictionary article or even to find something stupid than to find no article at all." (Aguaxima, Diderot)

Facsimiles
Readex Microprint Corporation, NY 1969. 5 vol. The full text and images reduced to four double-spread pages of the original appearing on one folio-sized page of this printing.

See also
 Democratization of knowledge

References
Citations

Bibliography
 Blom, Philipp, Enlightening the world: Encyclopédie, the book that changed the course of history, New York: Palgrave Macmillan, 2005, 
 
 Brewer, Daniel, "The Encyclopédie: Innovation and Legacy" in New Essays on Diderot, edited by James Fowler, Cambridge: Cambridge University Press, 2011, 
 Burke, Peter, A social history of knowledge: from Gutenberg to Diderot, Malden: Blackwell Publishers Inc., 2000, 
 Darnton, Robert. The Business of Enlightenment: A Publishing History of the Encyclopédie, 1775-1800. Cambridge: Belknap, 1979.
 Hunt, Lynn, The Making of the West: Peoples and Cultures: A Concise History: Volume II: Since 1340, Second Edition, Boston: Bedford/St. Martin's, 2007, 
 Kramnick, Isaac, "Encyclopédie" in The Portable Enlightenment Reader, edited by Isaac Kramnick, Toronto: Penguin Books, 1995, 
 Lough, John. The Encyclopédie. New York: D. McKay, 1971. 
 Magee, Bryan, The Story of Philosophy, New York: DK Publishing, Inc., 1998, 
 O'Sullivan, Dan. Wikipedia: A New Community of Practice? Farnham, Surrey, 2009, .
 Roche, Daniel. "Encyclopedias and the Diffusion of Knowledge." The Cambridge History of Eighteenth-century Political Thought. By Mark Goldie and Robert Wokler. Cambridge: Cambridge UP, 2006. 172–94. 
 Spielvogel, Jackson J, Western Civilization, Boston: Wadsworth Cengage Learning, 2011, 

Further reading
  d'Alembert, Jean Le Rond. Preliminary discourse to the Encyclopedia of Diderot, translated by Richard N. Schwab, 1995. 
 Darnton, Robert. "The Encyclopédie wars of prerevolutionary France." American Historical Review 78.5 (1973): 1331–1352. online
 Donato, Clorinda, and Robert M. Maniquis, eds.  The Encyclopédie and the Age of Revolution. Boston: G. K. Hall, 1992. 
 Encyclopédie ou dictionnaire raisonné des sciences, des arts et des métiers, Editions Flammarion, 1993. 
  Grimsley. Ronald. Jean d'Alembert (1963)
 Hazard, Paul. European thought in the eighteenth century from Montesquieu to Lessing (1954). pp. 199–224
 Kafker, Frank A.  and Serena L. Kafker.  The Encyclopedists as individuals: a biographical dictionary of the authors of the Encyclopédie (1988)  
 Lough, John. Essays on the Encyclopédie of Diderot and d'Alembert Oxford UP, 1968.
 Pannabecker, John R. Diderot, the Mechanical Arts, and the Encyclopédie, 1994. With bibliography.

External links

Digitized version of the Encyclopédie
Diderot – search engine in tribute to Diderot
University of Chicago on-line version with an English interface and the dates of publication
Guide to the Engraving "Aiguiller-Bonnetier" from Diderot's Encyclopedia 1762
Encyclopedia of Diderot and d'Alembert Collaborative Translation Project currently contains a growing collection of articles translated into English (3,053 articles and sets of plates as of September 30, 2020).
Online Books Page presentation of the first edition
  The Encyclopédie, BBC Radio 4 discussion with Judith Hawley, Caroline Warman and David Wootton (In Our Time'', Oct. 26, 2006)

 
18th-century books
Age of Enlightenment
Encyclopedie (Diderot and d'Alembert)
Modern philosophical literature
Philosophy of science literature
Science studies
Scientific revolution
Censored books